The 1905–06 season was the 12th in the history of Southern League. Fulham won Division One and Crystal Palace finished top of Division Two. No clubs were relegated from Division One as it was expanded to 20 clubs the following season. No clubs applied to join the Football League.

Division One

A total of 18 teams contest the division, including 17 sides from previous season and one new team.

Newly elected team:
 Norwich City

Division Two

A total of 13 teams contest the division, including 9 sides from previous season and four new teams, all of them are newly elected teams.

Newly elected teams:
 Crystal Palace 
 Leyton
 St Leonards United
 Southern United

References

1905-06
1905–06 in English association football leagues